Anthon is a Danish, Finnish, German, Norwegian and Swedish masculine given name that is used in Greenland, Finland, Norway, Sweden, Republic of Karelia, Estonia, Namibia, Denmark, Germany, Switzerland and Austria. Notable people with this name include the following:
 Anthon Bang (1809 – 1870), Norwegian writer and publisher
 Anthon Eriksson (born 1995), Swedish ice hockey player
 Anthon Frederiksen, Greenlandic politician
 Anthon Grimsmo (born 1968), Norwegian curler
 Anthon H. Lund (1844 – 1921), Danish Mormon missionaries
 Anthon B. Nilsen (1855 – 1936), Norwegian businessman and politician
 Anthon Olsen (1889 – 1972), Danish footballer
 Anthon van Rappard (1858 – 1892), Dutch painter and draughtsman

See also

Anthoni, name
Anthony (given name)
Anthos (disambiguation)
Anton (given name)
Antoon
Antron (given name)
Antton (name)
Antwon (name)
Antxon, name
Authon (disambiguation)

References

Danish masculine given names
Finnish masculine given names
German masculine given names
Norwegian masculine given names
Swedish masculine given names